Veal is the meat of young cattle.

Veal may also refer to:

Veal (surname)
Veal (band), Canadian musical group
Veal School, historic building in Georgia, United States